Machop Malual Chol (born 14 November 1998) is a South Sudanese professional footballer who plays as a forward for Major League Soccer club Atlanta United.

Club career
Born in Khartoum, Chol immigrated with his family to the United States in 2000. His family settled in Clarkston, Georgia, where he first learned to play soccer.  He began his career playing with youth club DDYSC Wolves before earning a spot in the Atlanta United academy in 2016.

In August 2017, Chol began playing college soccer for the Wake Forest Demon Deacons. He made his debut for the Demon Deacons on 25 August against the Rutgers Scarlet Knights where he scored his first goal. Throughout his time at Wake Forest, Chol scored 13 goals in 65 matches.

Atlanta United
On 19 January 2021, Chol signed a homegrown player contract with Major League Soccer club Atlanta United. He made his professional debut on 17 April 2021 against Orlando City, coming on as a substitute.

International career
Chol made his international debut for South Sudan on 27 January 2022 in a friendly defeat to Uzbekistan.

Career statistics

Club

International

References

External links
 Profile at Atlanta United
 National Football Teams profile

1998 births
Living people
People from Khartoum
Sudanese people of South Sudanese descent
Sudanese emigrants to the United States
Naturalized citizens of the United States
People from Tucker, Georgia
Sportspeople from DeKalb County, Georgia
Soccer players from Georgia (U.S. state)
American soccer players
Association football forwards
Wake Forest Demon Deacons men's soccer players
Atlanta United FC players
Major League Soccer players
Homegrown Players (MLS)
African-American soccer players
American people of South Sudanese descent
American sportspeople of African descent
Sportspeople of South Sudanese descent
People with acquired South Sudanese citizenship
South Sudanese footballers
South Sudan international footballers